Balusuan Island is an island located near Semporna in Sabah, Malaysia.

See also
 List of islands of Malaysia

References 

Islands of Sabah